Thomas Mackenzie Bell (born 22 February 1985), better known by the stage name of Toddla T, is an English DJ, record producer, remixer and songwriter from Sheffield, South Yorkshire.

Biography
Bell was raised in Sheffield where he attended King Edward VII School. He started DJing at the age of 14 in the clubs and bars of Sheffield and by the age of 16 had left school to pursue a full-time career in the music industry. His stage name was given to him by the older Sheffield DJs who influenced him and was used to indicate his relative youth. He has two children with his wife, fellow BBC Radio 1 DJ Annie Mac: a son, born in May 2013; and a second child, born 6 January 2017. Bell is a fan of Sheffield United F.C.

Career
Bell's first album, for 1965 Records, encompasses hip-hop, electro, garage, dancehall and house and was released in May 2009. The major collaborators were Serocee and Mr Versatile. The album also features further collaborations with Matt Helders from the Arctic Monkeys, Benjamin Zephaniah, Roots Manuva, Tinchy Stryder, Joe Goddard and Hervé.
He has created a mix album for the London nightclub Fabric.

Bell DJs in clubs and festivals throughout the UK, Europe, North America and Australia. He has a quarterly residency at XOYO and a soundsystem at Notting Hill Carnival. He has a weekly show on BBC Radio 1 BBC Radio 1Xtra and BBC Asian Network which has featured guests such as Skepta, JME, Novelist & Wiley. He is involved in recording and producing various artists including Roots Manuva, Skepta, Wiley, Ms. Dynamite & Róisín Murphy. He has remixed Little Dragon, Major Lazer and Hot Chip. In 2010 he signed to the record label Ninja Tune and released Watch Me Dance in 2011. In 2012, Bell started his record label Girls Music with Raf Rundell from The 2 Bears. Toddla is also a producer in his own right, having produced singles such as Young T & Bugsey's "Strike A Pose" and Headie One, AJ Tracey and Stormzy's "Ain't It Different".

In August 2020, Toddla announced that he would be leaving the BBC after 11 years at the end of September.

Discography

Studio albums

Compilation albums 
 FabricLive.47 (2009)

EPs 
 Do U Know, 1965 Records (2007)
 On Acid, Defected (2014)
 Kensal Road EP, Girls Music (2015)

Singles 
 "Fill Up Mi Portion", Do U Know (2007)
 "Backchatter (Mica's Version)", Do U Know (2007)
 "Inna Di Dancehall", Do U Know (2007)	
 "Girls", Do U Know (2007)	
 "Do U Know", Do U Know (2007)	
 "Inna Di Dancehall", Do U Know (2007)	
 "Manabadman" feat. Serocee & Trigganom (2008)
 "65 Dubplate" feat. Serocee & Trigganom (2008)
 "Soundtape Killin", (2008)
 "Shake It" with Hervé feat. Serocee (2009)
 "Sky Surfing (Dope Man)" (2010)
 "Streets So Warm" feat. Wayne Marshall (2011)
 "Take It Back" feat. Shola Ama & J2K, Ninja Tune (2011)
 "Watch Me Dance" with Roots Manuva (2011)
 "Cherry Picking" feat. Róisín Murphy (2011)
 "My God" - Trojan Sound System vs Toddla T (2011)
 "Alive" with Shola Ama (2012)
 "I Don't Wanna Hear That" with Danny Weed & Jammer (2015)
 "Walkin" - Toddla T meets The Suns of Dub (2015)
 "Big Tune a Drop" - Toddla T vs The 2 Bears (2015)

Songwriting and production credits

 Buff Nuff, Do Nah Bodda Mi & Im A New Man on the album, Slime & Reason, by Roots Manuva (2008)
 Who Wants To Be A Millionaire? on the album, Catch Me If You Can, by Bashy (2009)
 Life on the album, Catch Me If You Can, by Bashy (2009)
 I Don't Wanna Hear That, by Jammer, Toddla T and Danny Weed (2014)

Remixes 
 "One Pure Thought" (Toddla T remix) - Hot Chip
 "Have I Been a Fool" (Toddla T remix) - Jack Peñate
 "You Know Me Better" (Toddla T remix) - Róisín Murphy
 "Let Me Back" (Toddla T remix) - Zarif
 "Let the Spirit" (Ross Orton and Toddla T remix) - Roots Manuva
 "My Delerium" (Ross Orton and Toddla T remix) - Ladyhawke
 "Alemao" (Toddla T remix) - MC Gringo
 "My Spy" (Toddla T remix) - Ayah Marar
 "Council Estate" (Toddla T remix) - Tricky
 "Big Bad Wolf" (Toddla T remix) - Armand Van Helden
 "Hold You" (Toddla T remix) - Gyptian
 "101 FM" (Toddla T remix) - Little Simz, Spragga Benz

References

External links
 – official site

Toddla T Essential Mix at BBC Radio 1

Grime music artists
Ninja Tune artists
English DJs
English record producers
Musicians from Sheffield
1985 births
Living people
People educated at King Edward VII School, Sheffield
English radio DJs
BBC Radio 1 presenters
BBC Radio 1Xtra presenters
UK garage musicians
Electronic dance music DJs
Place of birth missing (living people)